See You Tomorrow is a 2016 Chinese-Hong Kong romantic comedy film directed by Chinese writer Zhang Jiajia in his directorial debut and produced and written by Wong Kar-wai with Alibaba Pictures. It is based loosely on Zhang's own best-selling book Passing From Your World in the collection I Belonged to You. It stars Tony Leung Chiu-wai, Takeshi Kaneshiro and singer and actress Angelababy (Angela Yeung Wing. Filming started in July 2015. It was released in China  by Alibaba Pictures on December 23, 2016.

Plot
A bar owner helps lonely people through their heartbreaks and takes a radio DJ under his wing.

Cast

 Tony Leung Chiu-wai as Chen Mo
 Takeshi Kaneshiro as Guan Chun
 Angelababy as Xiao Yu
 Eason Chan as Ma Li
 Lu Han as young Ma Li 
 Sandrine Pinna as Mao Mao
 Du Juan ad He Muzi
 Lynn Hung as Jiang Jie
 Da Peng
 Ma Su as A Sao
 Cui Zhijia 
 Jia Ling
 Li Yuchun 
 Ko Chia-yen as Bar patron

Reception
The film grossed  on its opening weekend in China. As of December 22, 2016, it grossed .

Reviews of the film were largely negative, causing the film to open below local forecast numbers. Maggie Lee of Variety called the film "an over-the-top and indigestible romantic comedy produced and co-scripted by Wong Kar-wai lacking any of the auteur's usual finesse". Clarence Tsui of The Hollywood Reporter said that the film is an "impermeable melange of shapeless storytelling, rehashed gags, vacuous relationships and painfully over-the-top performances from its usually top-notch cast".

Awards and nominations

References

External links

2016 romantic comedy-drama films
Chinese romantic comedy-drama films
2016 directorial debut films
Films based on short fiction
Films based on Chinese novels
Alibaba Pictures films
Films set in Shanghai
Films shot in Shanghai
Films scored by Nathaniel Méchaly
2016 comedy films
2016 drama films